This is a list of beaches in Albania:

Albanian Adriatic Sea 

 Durrës
 Golemi
 Kavaja
 Shëngjin
 Velipojë
 Shkëmbi i Kavajës

Albanian Ionian Sea 

 Borsh
 Dhërmi 
 Gjipe
 Himara
 Ksamil
 Palasë
 Piqeras

Albanian Ohrid Lake 

 Pogradec Beach

See also 
 List of beaches
 Albanian Riviera
 Albanian Ionian Sea Coast
 Albanian Adriatic Sea Coast
 Albanian Ohrid Lake Coast
 Important Bird Areas in Albania

References 

Beaches of Albania
Albania
Beaches
Beaches